Nord Stream (German-English mixed expression;  and , literally 'North Stream'; , Severny potok) is a network of offshore natural gas pipelines in Europe which run under the Baltic Sea from Russia to reunificated Germany. It comprises two separate projects, Nord Stream 1 and Nord Stream 2. Both pipelines each comprise two pipes, NS1 A and B as well as NS2 A and B, for a total of 4 physical pipes. Both pipelines land in Lubmin, Germany. They are majority owned (51 per cent) by Russia, along with German, Dutch and French stakeholders. The were financed by a consortium of companies from Russia, Germany, France, and the Netherlands and for the first time a pipeline bypassed Ukraine to deliver Russian natural gas directly to West Europe. The project was opposed from the start by the United States. 

 Nord Stream 1 (NS1) runs from Vyborg, in northwestern Russia near Finland, and entered service in 2011. It is operated by Nord Stream AG.
 Nord Stream 2 (NS2) runs from Ust-Luga in northwestern Russia near Estonia. The pipeline was built in order to increase gas exports towards Europe, aiming to double annual capacity. The project was completed in 2021, but has not yet entered service, because Germany withheld opening permission on February 22, 2022 due to Russia declaring that further parts of Ukraine Territory belonged to breakaway republics, in line with a previous joint warning made with US president Joe Biden on February 7, 2022 to kill the project if Russia tried to invade Ukraine

2022 sabotage 

On 26 September 2022, news broke of three explosions at the Nord Stream 1 and 2 natural gas pipelines. The blasts rendered three of the four lines inoperable and released vast quantities of gas into the Baltic Sea. 

None of the four pipes is currently operational, bringing the Nord Stream project to an effective standstill. Russia has confirmed one of the two Nord Stream 2 pipes is operable.

References